Gromada  is a Polish word meaning  "gathering", "group", or "assembly". In the Polish–Lithuanian Commonwealth, the term referred to a village organization which embraced all the inhabitants of a village and acted as a local authority, as well as overseeing tax payments. In this sense the gromada developed between the 16th and 18th centuries, and continued to function in Congress Poland.

The gromada continued to function in interwar Poland, as a subdivision of a gmina.

In communist Poland between 1954 and 1972, gromadas constituted the lowest tier of local government, taking over the role previously played by gminas. A gromada would generally consist of several villages, but they were smaller units than the gminas had been. In 1973 gminas were reintroduced and gromadas abolished.

A gromada is a former Polish unit of local government e.g.
 Gromada Osiek
 Gromada Tursko Wielkie

See also
 Hromada
 Hramada

Types of administrative division
Subdivisions of Poland